Hector Heathwood (born 1957 in Belfast, Northern Ireland) is a photographer of erotica, fetish and burlesque.

Early life
Heathwood was born and grew up in Belfast, County Down, Northern Ireland and is a British citizen. Leaving school at sixteen he originally trained as a television repairman. He has claimed to have been heavily involved in Belfast the punk scene in the late 1970s and has said that this period had a profound effect on his view of the world. After marrying for the first time in 1979, he took up photography as a hobby.

Early work
Almost immediately after he started photography Heathwood was exposed to the artistic and communicative aspects of the medium. His early influences were photographers such as Bill Brandt, Eve Arnold, Arnold Newman and Ralph Gibson.  Working in black and white and producing his prints from a home darkroom he worked on a documentary project about the retired shipbuilding community of his city. This led to his first exhibition at the Age Concern Offices in Belfast. He also started photographing women in their own environments.
Eventually this led him to take up a course of study at Napier Polytechnic of Edinburgh on their BA Degree in Photographic Studies in 1988, graduating in June 1991. While there his work split mainly into two categories; a documentary piece on transsexualism, the subject of his dissertation, and studio work on fetish and sexual roleplay. The mid-80s had seen the publication of 'Dark Summer' by Bob Carlos Clarke which had a profound effect on Heathwood's development as a photographer.
His degree show at Edinburgh's Filmhouse was the first time his fetish-related imagery was shown to the public and this was followed by a solo show at the capital's City Café. Before leaving Scotland with his future second wife Heathwood exhibited his transsexual documentary at the Antiquary, Edinburgh 1992.

ONCE
Based in Dublin, Ireland, since 1992 Heathwood continued working on fetish-related imagery and in 1994 began teaching photography. He also worked freelance as a commercial and editorial photographer. In 2001 Heathwood launched 'ONCE' which was Ireland's first exhibition of erotic art and expanded this into 'ONCE(again)' in 2003. This piece was featured in Amateur Photographer, Jade and Secret magazines and was shown in the Association of Erotic Artists' annual show in London and the Coffee, Cake & Kink gallery in that city's Covent Garden.

HOME
CoffeeCake&Kink commissioned Heathwood to create a show specifically for their exhibition space in Covent Garden. This became 'HOME' in 2006, an inquiry into how models in the given space occupy and control the composition to erotic effect. This piece stemmed from the experiences Heathwood had gained shooting for Suicide Girls, he was the first photographer in Ireland to feature work on this famous site. Again extracts from this work found their way onto the pages of Amateur Photographer, Jade and Secret magazines.

SPOTLITE
Taking the narrative and spatial themes from the previous exhibitions, along with Hollywood-style glamour portraits he'd completed, Heathwood produced 'SPOTLITE' .  A studio-based piece where the glare of a super trouper is used to define a single time and place in which he captures his photographs.  In this work Heathwood's models wear fetish, glamour and burlesque outfits to reflect the different inspirations he has gained from his prior experiences. He has said in interview that he felt 'SPOTLITE' was him finally speaking with his own photographic voice, in a way that was specific to him and not an extension of his influences. After introducing the work at CoffeeCake&Kink in 2008 it was given a six-page feature and front cover in the UK's largest selling amateur photography  photographic magazine, Amateur Photographer. Elements from 'SPOTLITE' are held in permanent exhibitions in the UK and USA and were published in Jade and Griff International magazines.

Current work
Working as a full-time lecturer in photography has allowed Heathwood to drop his commercial practice and concentrate on exhibiting and self-publishing. Previously Lustre Press, Ireland, has published the titles ‘ONCE’ (2010), ‘HOME’ (2010), ‘Whatcha Wearin?’ (2011) and ‘Who’s Your Daddy’ (2011). He is currently working on the book ‘SPOTLITE’ and a series of titles of his own back catalogue. He continues to take an active photographic role in Dublin's burlesque and fetish activities and is working on a new exhibit, 'Chiarascuro’

Books
 Fetish Photo Anthology Volume 4 by Jürgen Boedt. Published by Secret 2004 
 Fetish Photo Anthology Volume 5 by Jürgen Boedt. Published by Secret 2007 
 The Special Reserve Collection by Great Northern Publishing 2004

Exhibitions
 Age Concern Offices; Belfast 1988. Early documentary project on East Belfast's retired community.
 Napier Polytechnic Degree Show; Filmhouse, Edinburgh, 1991.
 City Cafe; Edinburgh, 1991. Images on the theme of sexual role-playing.
 The Antiquary; Edinburgh, 1992. Documentary project on transsexualism.
 Gallery of Photography; Dublin, 1994. Diary of a One Night Stand; documentary piece.
 Danceworld; Dublin, 1999. A series of images of the ballet.
 VIVA; Dublin, 2001. ONCE; an exhibition of fetish-fashion photographs.
 Gallery of Photography, Dublin. 2002 Work included in the Ben Smyth Memorial Exhibition.
 VIVA; Dublin, 2003. ONCE (again); an extension and updating of the ONCE exhibit.
 Woburn Gallery London, 2005, Group show of the Association of Erotic Artists.
 CCK Gallery, Covent Garden, London, 2006. HOME; erotic photography solo show.
 AMORA, Holborn, London, 2007. Selected group exhibition.
 EROTIC HERITAGE MUSEUM, Las Vegas, 2008. Selected group exhibition, Association of Erotic Artists.
 CHQ, Dublin. STANDING ALONE, 2008, group show of contemporary Irish photographers.
 ENLIGHTENMENT. Northend House, Milton Keynes, 2009. A group show of the Association of Erotic Artists.
 KILMAINHAM ARTS FESTIVAL 2010. Elements from Spotlite.
 EROTIC ART. THE GALLERY. Liverpool. 2011. Selected works.

References

External links
 Sunday Independent interview with Hector Heathwood
Amateur Photographer article and front cover
 Hector Heathwood's website
 Articles about Hector Heathwood
 Amateur Photographer obituary article for Bob Carlos Clarke

1957 births
Living people
British erotic photographers
People from Belfast
Photographers from Northern Ireland